Endapalli is a village in Telangana state of India. It is located in the Velgatoor mandal of Karimnagar District.

Demographics 
Telugu is the local language. The total population of Endapalli is 5,267.

References

Villages in Karimnagar district